The Nabataean religion was a form of Arab polytheism practiced in Nabataea, an ancient Arab nation which was well settled by the third century BCE and lasted until the Roman annexation in 106 CE. The Nabateans were polytheistic and worshipped a wide variety of local gods as well as Baalshamin, Isis, and Greco-Roman gods such as Tyche and Dionysus. They worshipped their gods at temples, high places, and betyls. They were mostly aniconic and preferred to decorate their sacred places with geometric designs. Much knowledge of the Nabataeans’ grave goods has been lost due to extensive looting throughout history. They made sacrifices to their gods, performed other rituals and believed in an afterlife.

Gods and goddesses

Most of the deities in Nabataean religion were part of the pre-Islamic Arab pantheon, with the addition of foreign deities such as Isis and Atargatis.

Dushara, a Nabataean deity whose name means, "Lord of the Mountain", he was widely worshiped in Petra. Dushara is venerated as a supreme god by the Nabataeans, oftentimes he is referred as "Dushara and all the gods". He is considered the god of the Nabataean royal house. The fall of the Nabatean royal house to the Romans, caused the religion to be cast aside and its main deity lost. It was then that Dushara was associated with other gods, like Dionysus, Zeus, and Helios.

Manāt, she was known as the goddess of fate, and was worshipped by the followers for rain and victory over enemies. She was the wife of god Hubal.

Allat, who is referred to as "the great goddess who is in Iram". She is widely known in Northern Arabia and Syria, the deity is associated with the goddess Athena in the Hawran. Allat is venerated in Palmyra, her temple had no sign of performing blood rituals. It is believed that Allat and Al-Uzza were once a single deity, which parted ways in the pre-Islamic Meccan tradition. Pre-Islamic Arabs believed that the goddesses Al-lāt, Al-‘Uzzá, and Manāt were the daughters of Allah though Nabataean inscriptions also describe her as Allah's wife instead. The Nabatean inscriptions also call her and Al-'Uzza as the "bride of Dushara".

Al-'Uzza, in Arabic her name is believed to mean "the mightiest one". She is venerated in the city of Petra. Her cult is mainly focused on the Quraysh and the Hurad valley north of Mecca. The goddess is connected with a type of betyl with star-like eyes.  Al-'Uzza is associated with the Greco-Roman goddess Aphrodite. Pre-Islamic Arabs believed her to be one of the daughters of Allah alongside Al-lāt and Manāt. Alongside, Allat she is called the "bride of Dushara" in some Nabataean inscriptions.

Al-Kutbay, one of the lesser known deities of the Nabataeans. The deity is said to have a temple in Gaia and was also venerated in Iram. There is confusion when it comes to deciding whether this deity is masculine or feminine. In Gaia, the deity is believed to be female and is therefore called Al-Kutbay. There are instances when the deity is believed to be masculine, for example in Qusrawet in Egypt, and the deity is called Kutba. The majority of the evidence leads to believe that this deity is female, for there are betyls of Al-Kutba that are similar in design to those of Al-'Uzza.

Baalshamin, a Syrian deity who becomes a Nabataean god with the expansion of Nabataea into Southern Syria. His named means "Lord of Heaven", associating the deity with the skies. He is said to originate from the storm god Hadad, who was worshiped in Syria and Mesopotamia. As a deity that deals with the heavens, he is identified by many as a version of Zeus. There is a temple dedicated to Baalshamin at Si, which seems to have been the center of a pilgrimage.

Qos, an ancient Edomite deity, which was worshiped at Tannur. There's an association with the god Apollo and with lightning.

Hubal, A deity worshiped in the Ka'bah at Mecca. It is said followers would go to the deity seeking answers to questions of lineage, marriage, and death. A sacrifice would take place to honor the god, there would be seven arrows of divination, these would be thrown and the answer would be one of the carved words on the side of the arrows.

Manotu, this deity is mentioned on the tomb inscriptions at Hegra. Her name is mentioned alongside Dushara, and is used as a warning to their curse. She is believed to be the same as the goddess Manāt of the Kaaba of Mecca who was one of the daughters of Allah.

Isis, foreign deity to the Nabataeans, she is originally an Egyptian goddess. She is represented by a throne at times. The goddess is seen in Petra's Khazneh, as well as the Temple of the Winged Lions.

Atargatis, she is a foreign deity to the Nabataeans, her cult center at Hierapolis and is venerated in Khirbet et-Tannur; she is referred to as the grain goddess and other times as the fish goddess. She is seen seated between two lions at times. Atargatis is also connected to the betyl with star-like eyes.

Shay'-al-Qawn, believed to be the protector of caravans and soldiers, people that would travel. It is said that his followers disapproved of wine.

Obodat, believed to be a deified king of the Nabataeans, it is not clear whether this would be Obodas I, II, or III. His association with the royal family leads to believe that he had a private cult.

Tyche, Nabataean goddess, often accompanied by the zodiac signs found in Khirbet-et-Tannur. She is often depicted with wings, the walls of a city for a crown and holding horns of plenty.

External influences on gods/goddesses

The majority of the Nabataean gods were foreign; they were adopted by the Nabataeans. Many of the Nabataean deities were being connected with Greco-Roman gods and goddesses, especially during the time that Nabataea was under Roman influence.  The goddess Isis, is an Egyptian deity that was not only seen in Nabataean religion but also Greek and Roman. The god Dushara is oftentimes mentioned as a version of Dionysius. The god Helios, and Eros are found in Nabataean temples as well. During Nabataea's annexation to the Romans, there were tombs that named Greco-Roman gods instead of Nabataean gods. There is a shift in religion after the annexation of Nabataean land. For example, in the temple of Qasr, Aphrodite/al-'Uzza and Dushara were worshipped.

Relationships between the gods

The relationships between the Nabataeans gods are not always clear due to the lack of evidence to support the different claims. There are times when gods and goddesses are paired as husband and wife in a certain region of the kingdom, while they may not be in another. The god Dushara is sometimes said to be the husband of Allat and in other instances he is the son of Allat. Another example would be Allat, Al-'Uzza and Manat, these three deities are said to be the daughters of the high god Allah. In some regions of the Nabataean kingdom, both Allat and Al-'Uzza are said to be the same goddess.

Rituals and animals

It is very likely that in the city of Petra, there were processional ways from temple to temple, such as the Qasr el-Bint temple, the Temple of the Winged Lions and the Great Temple. The main street flowed through the city making it possible for a processional way to have taken place. There are other processional ways that could have been linked to the so-called high-places, such as el-Madh-bah, by passing the "Roman Soldier" tomb, the "Garden Temple", the Lion monument, a rock-cut altar, before arriving at the high place. Nabataeans would visit the tombs of relatives and had ritual feasting and would fill the space with incense and perfumed oils. It is also very likely that there were goods left inside the tombs, a way of remembering those who died. Remains of unusual species like raptors, goats, rams, dogs were used in some of the rituals. It was also not uncommon to sacrifice camels to the ancient gods, especially the god Dushara.

Sacred objects or animals

Niches - Described as miniature temples or adyton of a temple. They contain stone pillar or betyls that were carved out of rock.
Altars - At times the Nabataeans used altars as representation of the gods.
Sacred animals - Eagles, serpents, sphinxes, griffins and other mythological figures decorate the tombs of the ancient Nabataeans.
Iconoclasm - There is little evidence of Nabataean iconoclasm. The majority of the deities were portrayed as betyls, sometimes carved in relief and others would be carried around during processions. When the gods were depicted in human form, they would oftentimes were found as "eye-idol" betyls. Because of the Greco-Roman influence there are statues of Nabataean gods. The goddess Isis is represented in human form by the Nabataeans, this could be due to the fact that she is venerated in places like Egypt and Rome. The god Dushara is represented in both betyl and statue form throughout the Nabataean kingdom.

Places of worship

The Nabataeans had numerous places for religious practice and cult worship. Known as “High places”, the shrines, temples, and altars would usually be open air structures placed atop nearby mountains. These places throughout the Nabataean kingdom would be dedicated to the worship of the same god(s), how they would go about this worship would vary from site to site. Offering would vary from material goods and foods, to live sacrifice of animals, maybe humans. The Nabataean kingdom can broke up into five religious regions each containing locations of religious significance: The Negev and Hejaz, The Hauran, Central Jordan, Southern Jordan, and finally Northwestern Saudi Arabia. All of the religious sites at these locations are in varying states of preservation, making it difficult to know which deities would have been worshiped at specific shrines, altars, and temples. It is also difficult to know the specifics of the cult practices, meaning educated speculations can be made.

The Negev and Hejaz

Sobata
	
Located about 40k southwest from Beersheba is the city of Sobata, one of the major cities within the Nabataean kingdom. Very little archeological remains of any form of Nabataean cult worship, temples, shrines, or altars have been found. A small amount of evidence has been found for the worship of Dushara.
		
Avdat

Located in the mountains southeast of Sobata. Religious practice here focused mostly on the deified Obodas I, who gained fame from reclaimed lands in the Negev from Alexander Jannaeus, causing the formation of a “King’s cult.”   There are at least two documented Nabataean temple complex atop the acropolis, the smaller of the two being dedicated to the deified Obodas III.
		
Rawwafah

Located 300 km from Petra. A single temple in the Nabataean style has been discovered. The inscription on the lintel dates the temple to after the fall of the Nabataean kingdom.
		
Mampsis

A Nabataean site located about 81 km from Petra. Mampsis is an important stop on the Incense trade road. Nabataean style building, caravanserai, and water systems have been discovered here.

The Hauran

Bostra

Located in southern Syria, and was the northern capital of the Nabataean kingdom. Bostra has evidence of temples being located at major intersections of the city. At the city center is a temple complex dedicated to Dushara-A’ra. A’ra is thought to be the god of Nabataean kings and city of Bostra itself. Modern building make it difficult to find archaeological evidence of Nabataean cult worship. An inscription that reads “This is the wall which ... and windows which Taymu bar ... built for…Dushara and the rest of the gods of Bostra” is located on what is thought to be this temple. 
		
Seeia

Located north of Bostra near Canatha. The settlement has three large temples, the largest is dedicated to Baalshamin. The two smaller temples are to unknown deities. One contains an inscription to the local goddess, Seeia, and may have been used to worship her. The temple complex is not Nabataean in design, but is an amalgamation of architectural building styles from the cultures on the northern Nabataean border.
		
Sahr

Temples similar in style to the ones located in Wadi Rumm, Dharih, Tannur, and Qasrawet.
		
Sur

Temples similar in style to the ones located in Wadi Rumm, Dharih, Tannur, and Qasrawet.
		
Suweida

Temples similar to those located near Petra in Wadi Rumm, Dharih, Tannur, and Qasrawet. Nabataean inscription indicate cults dedicated to Allat and Baalshamin.

Central Jordan

Khirbet Tannur

Located in Central Jordan. The temple, High place, is located alone, atop the summit of Jebal Tannur. It is only accessible via a single, steep staircase pathway. The sites seclusion may indicate that it was of high religious importance to the Nabataeans. The doorway to the inner sanctuary of the temple is decorated with representations of vegetation, foliage, and fruits. Glueck identifies these as representing the Syrian goddess Atargatis. The inner sanctuary decorated with images of fruit, fishes, vegetation, thunderbolts, as well as representation of deities. Glueck attributes these iconographies to the Mesopotamian storm-god Hadad, but Tyche and Nike are also represented. Starckly notes that the only named god is the Edomite weather god, Qos. An inscription on a stele at the site names him as the god of Hurawa.
	
Khirbet edh-Dharih

Located 7 km south of Hurawa, the temple at Khirbet edh-Dharih is astonishingly well preserved. The temple complex is surrounded by an outer and inner courtyard, with a paved pathway to the porticoes. There are also has benches the form a theatron. The temple itself is divided into three sections, in a large open vestibule. From here is the cella, which was painted in rich, vibrant colors. At the back of the cella was the motab and betyl, a square podium flanked by stairs which was the seat of the divine. Despite its good condition, it is not known which god would have been worshipped here.

Southern Jordan

Petra
 
Capital of the Nabataean Kingdom in around 312 BC. The city is famous for its marvelous rock-cut architecture. Located within the Shara Mountains, Dushara was the primary male god accompanied by the female trinity: Al-'Uzzá, Allat, and Manāt. A Stele dedicated to the Edomite god Qos is located within the city. Nabataeans worshiped pre-Islamic Arab gods and goddesses, along with deified kings, such as Obodas I. Temple layout and design shows influence from Rome, Greek, Egyptian, and Persian temple architecture. The temples of Qasr al-Bint and temple of the Winged Lion are examples of this. The podium within the Temple of the Winged Lion housed the altar, where sacrifices would have been made, or the betyl of the worshiped deity. Based on the idols and imagery found within the Temple of the Winged Lion, it is theorized to be dedicated to Dushara. The High Place is located atop the mountains that surround Petra. Used as a place for offering gifts and sacrificing animals, maybe humans, to the gods, The High place consists of a pool for collecting water, two altars, and a large open courtyard.
	
Hawara

Temple with 20m long processional way which leads to a courtyard with a view of Jebel Qalkha. The design of the Betyls as well as the remains of offering points to the possible worship of Dushara, maybe even Jupiter.
	
Wadi Ramm

Temple to Allat. Rock sanctuary to Ayn esh-Shallaleh located behind temple to Allat. Betyls and cult niches to Dushara and Baalshamin.

Northwestern Saudi Arabia

Hegra

A Cult ritual circle on top of the mountain Jibel Ithlib rests on a rocky outcropping. Small betyls and cult niches to other gods appear around the Jibel Ithlib site. Inscription of “Lord of the Temple,” may refer to Dushara. Marseha cults located here. Today Hegra is known as Mada’in Saleh.

Processional ways
The processional way that would lead to the places of worship would vary from site to site. Some places would be bargain rock, lacking any decorated on the processional way. While others, like Petra, would have carvings, monuments, sculpture, betyls, and occasionally obelisks lining the processional way. Petra’s processional way consists of a lion relief known as the Lion Fountain, there is also the Garden Tomb, and the Nabataean Quarry, two standing obelisks in an Indian style.

Temple layout
Nabataean temples vary greatly in design with no single standard layout. The Nabataeans adopted and adapted different elements of the temple designs from the cultures that they traded with. Indian, Greek, Roman, Persian, Egyptian, and Syrian elements of temple design can be seen to varying degrees of incorporation.

Betyls

Betyls are blocks of stone which represent the gods of the Nabataeans. The term “betyl” derives from the Greek Βαιτύλια and a myth the Greeks told of Ouranos who created animated stones that fell from heaven. Betyls were commonly placed on altars or platforms and religious rituals were performed there. Infrequently, betyls have been found in tombs. Dr. Gustaf Dalman was the first to classify the many different types of betyls. 
The different types of betyls according to Dr. Dalman:
Plain betyls
Rectangular slab (Pfeiler, block, stela)
 High rectangular slab with a rounded top
 Semicircular or hemispherical slab
Dome-shaped spherical betyl (squat omphalos, ovoid)
Eye betyls betyls 
Face stelae
Eye betyls and face stelae are of interest to scholars due to the inconsistency in what is largely understood as Nabataean aniconism. There is debate on whether the betyls were viewed as containers for gods or if they were seen as representations of the gods themselves. Grooves in the floors of niches and holes in the tops of altars have led to the conclusion that betyls may have been stored for safe-keeping then transported to the worship site.

Rituals

Offerings
Offerings of libations (most probably wine) and incense played an important role in Nabataean communal worship. There are speculations that the Nabataeans offered oils or perhaps other goods but the only definite offerings are libations and incense. Strabo confirms that libations and frankincense were offered daily to the sun (Dushara). There is also evidence of silver and gold offerings to gods, but the text this is found in is not clear on if this could be a tithe.

Sacrifices
Sacrifices of animals were common and Porphyry’s De Abstenentia reports that, in Dumat Al-Jandal, a boy was sacrificed annually and was buried underneath an altar. Some scholars have extrapolated this practice to the rest of the Nabataeans.

Specific dates
There are few primary sources regarding religious festivals the Nabataeans celebrated. It has been noted that the presence of two inscriptions to Dushara-A’ra dated in the month of Nisan could indicate a spring festival.

Funerary rituals

Meaning of tomb architecture
The famous rock-cut tombs of the Nabataeans were not decorated just for show, they were meant to be comfortable homes for the dead. Like the Egyptians, the Nabataeans believed that the deceased lived on and must be fed after death. Therefore, those who could afford to placed gardens for entertainment and eating halls for feasting around their tombs. Eagles—the symbol of Dushara—were sometimes carved above doorways for protection.

Curses
Many tombs were fashioned with inscriptions that conveyed who was meant to be buried in the tomb, as well as communicated the social status and piety of the owner. Inscriptions on tombs became popular throughout Nabataea. They list actions (e.g. selling or mortgaging the tomb, etc.) that should not be undertaken as well as detail fines and punishments for those who ignore curses etched into the inscriptions on the face of the tomb. The curses detailed in the inscriptions are often formulaic, e.g. “and the curse of [insert name of god] on anyone who reads this inscription and does not say [insert blessing or other phrase]”. The inscriptions of Mada'in Saleh and other large Nabataean cities name both the owners and curses as well as the types of people who are supposed to be buried in the tomb. Petran tombs, however, besides the Tomb of Sextius Florentinus, the Turkmaniyah Tomb and other exceptions, did not have inscriptions.

Concepts of the afterlife
Little is known about how the Nabataeans viewed the afterlife, but assumptions have been made based on the material goods they left behind. Since tombs and grave goods remain a valuable link to understanding the lives of any ancient culture, import is placed on the layout of the tombs at Petra, Bosra, Mada'in Saleh and other prominent cities. Known grave goods include an alabaster jug found at Mamphis and assorted vessels left over from funerary feasts. Based on the emphasis placed on familial burial niches, dining halls, and grave goods the Nabataeans thought the afterlife was a place where you could eat and be merry with your friends and family.

See also
Religion in pre-Islamic Arabia
Religion in Ancient Rome

References

Further reading
 Moutsopoulos, N. “Observations sur les representations du Panthéon Nabatéen”. In: Balkan studies 33 (1992): 5-50.

Nabataea